Setnica is a dispersed settlement that is divided between the municipalities of Medvode and Dobrova–Polhov Gradec in the Upper Carniola region of Slovenia. The smaller part is on the Medvode side.

References

External links

Setnica on Geopedia

Populated places in the Municipality of Medvode